Las Tablas District is a district (distrito) of Los Santos Province in Panama. The population according to the 2000 census was 24,298. The capital lies at the city of Las Tablas.

Administrative divisions
Las Tablas District is divided administratively into the following corregimientos:

Santa Librada de Las Tablas (capital)
Bajo Corral
Bayano
El Carate
El Cocal
El Manantial
El Muñoz
El Pedregoso
La Laja
La Miel
La Palma
La Tiza

Las Palmitas
Las Tablas Abajo
Nuario
Palmira
Peña Blanca
Río Hondo
San José
San Miguel
Santo Domingo
El Sesteadero
Valle Rico
Vallerriquito

References

Districts of Panama
Los Santos Province